The Zodiac Game is a British game show that aired on ITV from 6 January 1984 to 27 August 1985 original format devised by Ron Bareham and is hosted by Tom O'Connor with Bernard Fitzwalter as the first resident astrologer, succeeded by Russell Grant.

Format
The format of the game was a pair of contestants, one a celebrity and the other not, each answering questions about the other based on what the other's zodiac sign says they should answer. (For example, a gemini would never go into a bar and choose X drink). The resident astrologer would then explain the correct answer to the competitors and to the audience as well.

Transmissions

External links

1984 British television series debuts
1985 British television series endings
1980s British game shows
English-language television shows
ITV game shows
Television shows produced by Anglia Television
Television series by ITV Studios